Michele Cerofolini (born 4 January 1999) is an Italian professional footballer who plays as a goalkeeper for Fiorentina.

Club career

Fiorentina
Cerofolini is a product of Fiorentina youth teams and started playing for their Under-19 squad in the 2015–16 season at the age of 17. He started making bench appearances for Fiorentina's senior squad in the 2016–17 Serie A season. On 23 August 2017, he made his first appearance for Fiorentina's senior squad, coming on as an 87th-minute substitute for Bartłomiej Drągowski (becoming Fiorentina's third goalkeeper of the game) in a friendly Trofeo Santiago Bernabéu matchup against Real Madrid. In 2017–18 season, he appeared on the bench in most of the Serie A games for Fiorentina, but did not play in any, remaining a backup to Marco Sportiello and Dragowski.

Loan moves
On 13 July 2018, Cerofolini joined Serie B club Cosenza on a season-long loan. He made his professional debut in Serie B for Cosenza on 26 September 2018 in a 2–0 away defeat against Cremonese. One month later, on 30 October, he played his second match for the club, a 1–1 home draw against Pescara. However, in January 2019, his loan was interrupted and he returned to Fiorentina leaving Cosenza with only these 2 appearances, remaining an unused substitute for 17 times during the loan, here he was the third goalkeeper after Pietro Perina and Umberto Saracco.

On 25 January 2019, Cerofolini moved on another loan, to Serie C club Bisceglie. Two days later, on 27 January, he made his debut in a 1–0 home defeat against Viterbese Castrense. Two weeks later, on 10 February, he kept his first clean sheet for the team in a 0–0 home draw against Trapani and two more weeks later, on 24 February, he kept his second in a 0–0 away draw against Paganese. He became Bisceglie's first-choice in the second part of the season. Cerofolini ended his six-month loan to Bisceglie with 13 appearances, 11 goals conceded and 6 clean sheets.

After appearing on the bench three times for Fiorentina in November and December 2019, on 9 January 2020 he joined Serie C club Casertana on loan. Three days later, on 12 January, he made his debut for the club in a 2–2 away draw against Rende. Ten more days later, on 22 January, Cerofolini kept his first clean sheet for Casertana in a 0–0 home draw against Potenza. On 9 February he kept his second clean sheet in a 0–0 home draw against Bisceglie. Cerofolini ended his six-month loan to Casertana with eight appearances, eight goals conceded and two clean sheet.

On 20 August 2020, Cerofolini was loaned to newly promoted Serie B club Reggiana on loan for the 2020–21 season.

On 28 January 2022, he joined Alessandria on loan.

International career
Cerofolini was first chosen to represent his country when he was called up to Italy national under-18 football team for a series of friendlies in February 2017.

Later in the same year he began to be called up to the Under-19 squad, and eventually was included in Italy's roster for the 2018 UEFA European Under-19 Championship, in which Italy was the runner-up to Portugal. He did not make any appearances at the tournament, serving as back-up to Alessandro Plizzari.

In the fall of 2018 he was included in Italy's Under-20 squad and played in 2018–19 Under 20 Elite League games.

On 13 October 2020, he made his debut with the Italy U21 playing as a starter in a qualifying match won 2–0 against Republic of Ireland in Pisa.

Career statistics

Club

Honours 
Italy U19
 UEFA European Under-19 Championship runner-up: 2018

References

External links
 Profile at the ACF Fiorentina website 
 

Living people
1999 births
Sportspeople from Arezzo
Italian footballers
Footballers from Tuscany
Association football goalkeepers
Italy youth international footballers
Serie B players
Serie C players
ACF Fiorentina players
Cosenza Calcio players
A.S. Bisceglie Calcio 1913 players
Casertana F.C. players
A.C. Reggiana 1919 players
U.S. Alessandria Calcio 1912 players